Stanley Meltzoff (March 27, 1917 - November 9, 2006) was an American painter most known for his marine paintings.

Early life and career
Born in New York City to father Nathan, a cantor at a Manhattan synagogue, Stanley Meltzoff graduated from the City College of New York and became an instructor at Pratt Institute.  Serving in Italy during World War II, he was an artist and journalist for the U.S. military magazine Stars and Stripes. He also created visuals for Puptent Poets, a paperback of soldiers' verse.

Returning to New York City after the war, he spent years alternating between teaching and art before becoming a full-time illustrator in 1949.

Later career
During the 1950s, Meltzoff created dozens of paperback covers for novels by Robert Heinlein and others, and did artwork for Madison Avenue advertising agencies. He painted covers and interior spreads for magazines including Life, National Geographic, The Saturday Evening Post, and The Atlantic, providing covers to Scientific American.

With the advent of low-cost color photography and reproduction in the early 1960s, Meltzoff began painting saltwater game fish in their undersea environments. His marine-life art ran in such magazines as Sports Illustrated, Field and Stream, Gray's Sporting Journal, Outdoor Life, Sporting Classics, Sports Afield, and Wildlife Art.

Recognition
Meltzoff's art hangs in The National Gallery and the Getty Museum.

Personal life
Meltzoff was a member of the Society of Animal Artists.

Meltzoff died in 2006 at age 89.

References

External links
 Official website

20th-century American painters
American male painters
21st-century American painters
21st-century American male artists
Animal artists
Wildlife artists
1917 births
2006 deaths
20th-century American male artists